Dupur Thakurpo is a Bengali web series streaming on hoichoi produced by SVF. The series is about the Thakurpos (brother-in-law) and Boudis (Bengali name of sister-in-law). Director of season 1 is Debaloy Bhattacharya describes the details about what the title of the web series actually mean. In season 1, the main role as Uma boudi was played by Bengali actress Swastika Mukherjee. In season 2, Bhojpuri actress Monalisa plays the main role of Jhuma Boudi and make her début in Bengali web series. In Season 3, Bollywood actress Flora Saini played the role as Phulwa Boudi and made her début in Bengali web series.

Cast 
Swastika Mukherjee as Uma Boudi
Monalisa as Jhuma Boudi
Flora Saini as Phulwa Boudi
Rudranil Ghosh
Abhijit Guha as Jibon Babu
Anindya Chatterjee as CD
Indrajit Mazumder as Choco
Soumendra Bhattacharya as MTV
Kartikeya Tripathi as Shomes
Apratim Chatterjee as Kinky
Taufeeq Ahmed as Phantom
Writwik Mukherjee

Episodes

Season 1 (2017)
The first season of the Dupur Thakurpo was released on 1 October 2017 with ten episodes. In the first season, six bachelors live as tenants of Jiban Babu's wife. Jiban Babu marries a young girl and the bachelors become very excited about their new boudi Uma. Swastika Mukherjee plays the main role as Uma boudi.

Season 2 (2018)
The second season of Dupur Thakurpo was launched on 26 May 2018 with brand new five episodes. Season 2 was directed by Ayan Chakraborti, this time the main role changed its name. In season 2 the main role as Boudi of the series changed its name to Jhuma Boudi instead of Uma Boudi. The role was played by Bhojpuri actress Monalisa.

Season 3 (2019)
Dupur Thakurpo season 3 was launched on 25 October 2019 with all-new 5 episodes. This time the role of Phulwa boudi played by Bollywood actress Flora Saini who made her debut in the Bengali web series through Dupur Thakurpo. This time hoichoi introduced 7 new Thakurpos (Brother-in-law) who are very devotional towards boudi. In the story batman is very close to his marriage but he is devotee on a boudi he has no interest to his newly married wife. All the thakurpos come to know about the boudi fantasises about her.

References

External links

Indian web series
2017 web series debuts
Bengali-language web series
Hoichoi original programming